The 1930 Eastern Suburbs season was the 23rd season that the Eastern Suburbs (now known as the Sydney Roosters) competed in the New South Wales Rugby League.

Details

 Lineup:
Arthur Halloway (Coach)
• Cyril Abbotomey
• Perc Atkinson
• Morrie Boyle
• Dave Brown
• Joe Busch
• Hugh Byrne
• Jack Coote
• T. Fitzpatrick
• Gordon Fletcher
• Jack Hickey
• Billy Hong
• Joe Joseph
• Jack Lynch
• Joe Pearce
• Norm Pope
• Les Rogers
• Ray Stehr

Ladder

Season summary

 Rugby league legend Dave Brown made his debut for the Eastern Suburbs club.
 Round 1 - Eastern Suburb defeating Balmain 12 at Wentworth Park Ground.
 Round 2 - Eastern Suburb 11 defeated St George 6 at Earl Park.
 Round 3 - Western Suburbs 24 defeated Eastern Suburb 12 at Sydney Sports Ground.
Morrie Boyle was the leading Try scorer, with 15 Tries, in the NSWRL

References

External links
Rugby League Tables and Statistics

Sydney Roosters seasons
East